SS George Weems was a Liberty ship built in the United States during World War II. She was named after George Weems, who in 1828, established steamship travel on the Rappahannock River.

Construction
George Weems was laid down on 19 August 1942, under a Maritime Commission (MARCOM) contract, MCE hull 918, by the Bethlehem-Fairfield Shipyard, Baltimore, Maryland; she was sponsored by Miss Elizabeth Chew Weems, a descendant of George Weems, and was launched on 26 September 1942.

History
She was allocated to Moore-McCormack Lines, Inc., on 7 October 1942. On 10 November 1948, she was sold and transferred to Norway.

References

Bibliography

 
 
 
 

 

Liberty ships
Ships built in Baltimore
1942 ships
Maritime incidents in 1948
Maritime incidents in 1966